Abuja Rail Mass Transit commonly known as Abuja Light Rail is a regional rail transport system in the Federal Capital Territory of Nigeria. It is the first rapid transit system in the country, West Africa, and the second such system in sub-saharan Africa (after Addis Ababa Light Rail). The first phase of the project connects the city center to Nnamdi Azikiwe International Airport, stopping at the Abuja-Kaduna Railway station in Idu. The Abuja Metro Line was launched on 12 July 2018 and a three-trains-per-day service opened for passengers the following week.

History
A regional rail system serving Abuja had begun planning in 1997 but was delayed due to funding issues. CCECC Nigeria was awarded a contract for the construction of the first two phases, known as Lots 1 and 3, in May 2007.

The  first phase has two lines and 12 stations opened in July 2018, connecting Abuja city centre with the international airport via the Lagos–Kano Standard Gauge Railway at Idu. The projected cost of the entire proposed  network, to be developed in six phases, is US $824 million, constructed by China Civil Engineering Construction Corporation, with 60% of the cost funded by loans from the Exim Bank of China.

In early 2020, passenger service on the line was suspended due to the COVID-19 pandemic, and as of early 2022 had not resumed.

Operations 
 
 

Upon opening in 2018, only the section between Abuja Metro Station and the Airport was operational, with an intermediate station at Idu. The remaining nine stations were originally scheduled to begin operations in 2020.

The rolling stock used for this line initially consisted of only three diesel rail coaches. A further three were scheduled to be delivered in mid-2020.

From the opening, the rail line operated on a significantly reduced timetable in comparison to other worldwide light rail systems; with three daily departures from Idu to Abuja Metro Station, with two running the full length to the airport, on weekdays only. The delivery of further rolling stock was anticipated to provide services every thirty minutes.

Network 
The first part of the network was commissioned on July 12, 2018, and three stations opened in this first phase. An asterisk refers to stations subsequently opened.

Yellow line 
The Yellow line travels from Abuja's Central Business District to Nnamdi Azikiwe International Airport.

Blue Line 
The Blue Line will travel from Idu to Kubwa.

Future expansion
A network totalling  is proposed, divided into six phases or 'lots'. Lots 1 and 3 have finished construction.

 Lot 2 is from Gwagwa via Transportation Centre (Metro Station) to Nyanya/Karu
 Lot 4 is from Kuje to Karshi with the remaining legs of the Transitway Line 2
 Lot 5 from Kubwa via Bwari to Suleja
 Lot 6 from Airport via Kuje and Gwagwalada to Dobi.

See also
 Lagos Rail Mass Transit
 Transport in Nigeria
 Rail transport in Nigeria

References

Transport in Abuja
Abuja
Light rail in Nigeria
Proposed transport infrastructure in Nigeria
Railway lines opened in 2018
2018 establishments in Nigeria
21st-century architecture in Nigeria